William Dix (1883 or 1887–circa 1944) was a rugby union player who represented Australia.

Dix, a fullback, was born in Newcastle, New South Wales and claimed a total of 4 international rugby caps for Australia.

References

                   

Australian rugby union players
Australia international rugby union players
Year of birth uncertain
Rugby union players from Newcastle, New South Wales
Rugby union fullbacks